Market houses are a notable feature of many Northern Ireland towns with varying styles of architecture, size and ornamentation making for a most interesting feature of the streetscape.  Originally there were three, four or even five bays on the ground floor which were an open arcade.  An upper floor was often used as a court house or ballroom.   Ornamentation consisted of a cupola, a clock or sometimes a dome or tower. Today most of the market houses in Ireland have been put to use as cultural venues or business premises.  Some are still derelict.

Table of market houses locations

See also
 Architecture of Ireland
 List of country houses in the United Kingdom
 List of towns and villages in Northern Ireland
 List of market houses in the Republic of Ireland
 Tholsel

References

 A Topographical Dictionary of Ireland, Samuel Lewis (1838)
 Buildings at Risk (various volumes) – Ulster Architectural Heritage Society
 Saintfield Conservation Area – The Planning Service agency of Department of the Environment for Northern Ireland

Further reading
 McParland, Edward (2001) Public Architecture in Ireland 1680–1760 Yale University Press

External links
 Ulster Architectural Heritage Society
 Irish Antiquities (with many pictures of Market Houses)

Architecture in Northern Ireland
Northern Ireland
Lists of buildings and structures in Northern Ireland